Club Libertad is a professional football club based in Asunción, Paraguay that currently plays in the Paraguayan Primera División. The club plays its home games at Estadio Tigo La Huerta; which holds 10,100 people.

Founded in 1905, Libertad is the third most successful Paraguayan football club, winning 22 national titles, only behind rivals Olimpia and Cerro Porteño.

History
The club was founded on 30 July 1905 by a group of young men and students. Its first president was Juan Manuel Sosa, who chose the club's name.

Since winning its first championship in 1910, Libertad has always been overshadowed by the two big clubs in Paraguay: Olimpia and Cerro Porteño, who together won most of the Paraguayan football national championships. Despite that, Libertad has confirmed its position as the third "big" team of Paraguay by winning 21 championships, ten more than Guaraní, which has eleven.

In 1952, Libertad participated in the Copa Rio. The club played three matches. In the first match against Austria Wien, the opposition won 4–2. In the next match, against Corinthians, the Brazilians won 6–1. In its last game against German club 1. FC Saarbrücken, the Paraguayan club won 4–1, to finish the cup with one win and two defeats.

The club's first participation in the Copa Libertadores was in 1968, where they finished last with one win, one draw and 4 losses in a group containing Peñarol, Nacional, and Guaraní. In the 1977 Copa Libertadores Libertad reached the semi-finals. They began their campaign by finishing first in their group. That gave them qualification to the semi-finals, where they had to play two legs against Boca Juniors and Deportivo Cali. The winner of the group advanced to the finals, which was Boca Juniors. Libertad finished last of the semi-finals group with one win, one draw and two losses.

In 1998, the club was relegated for the first time in its history. In the Apertura tournament it finished last, and in the Clausura it finished second-to-last. A 4–3 defeat to rivals Guaraní on the last matchday, as well as their league position in 1997, secured the club's relegation. The club spent two years in the second tier before returning to the top tier in 2001 after winning the league title in 2000. The club went through lots of success after their return to the top tier, as noted by winning the league titles in 2002 and 2003.

Libertad reached the semi-finals of Copa Libertadores for the second time in history in 2006, where Libertad topped its group and beat powerhouses Corinthians and River Plate on their way to being knocked out by winners Internacional. Despite the elimination, more success came for the club, because it became a three-time-champion by winning the 2007 Clausura, 2008 Apertura, and 2008 Clausura.

In the 2013 Copa Sudamericana, the club made the semi-finals, beginning their campaign in the first stage by beating Montevideo Wanderers and Mineros in the second stage. Then they beat Sport Recife and Itagüí in the round of 16 and quarter-finals, before being eliminated by Lanús, who eventually won the competition. They also made the semi-finals again in 2017, losing to another Argentine club, Independiente, who also won the competition.

Rivalries 
Libertad has a rivalry with the other two "big clubs" of the country, Olimpia and Cerro Porteño, but mainly has one with Olimpia, and matches disputed between the two clubs are called "Clásico Blanco y Negro" (White and Black Classic). The first "clasico" was played in September 1906, with Olimpia winning 5-4. Repollero won the 2003 league title by beating Olimpia 6-5 on penalties. Overall, there have been 255 matches disputed between them, with Olimpia winning 112 and Libertad winning 74.

The club also shares a rivalry with the fourth-biggest club in the country, Guaraní. The first match between the two clubs was played in 1921, which was won by Guarani to obtain the league title that year. The rivalry became greater in 1998, after Guaraní won 4-3 on the last matchday to cause Libertad's only relegation into the second division.

Performance in CONMEBOL competitions 
Copa Libertadores: 20 appearances

Best: Semi-finals (2): 1977, 2006

Copa Sudamericana: 14 appearances

Best: Semi-finals (3): 2013, 2017, 2021

Honours
Source:
División Profesional
Champions (22): 1910, 1917, 1920, 1930, 1943, 1945, 1955, 1976, 2002, 2003, 2006 Apertura, 2007 Clausura, 2008 Apertura, 2008 Clausura, 2010 Clausura, 2012 Clausura, 2014 Apertura, 2014 Clausura, 2016 Apertura, 2017 Apertura, 2021 Apertura, 2022 Apertura
Division Intermedia
Champions (1): 2000
Copa Paraguay
Champions (1): 2019

Current squad

Managerial history
 Gerardo Martino (January 2006 – February 2007)
 Sergio Markarián (2007 – June 2007)
 Rubén Israel (July 2007 – December 2008)
 Javier Torrente (2009–2010)
 Gregorio Pérez (2010–2011)
 Jorge Burruchaga (2011–2012)
 Rubén Israel (2012–2013)
 Pedro Sarabia (2 September 2013 – 2016)
 Fernando Jubero (December 2016 – 23 December 2017)
 Aldo Bobadilla (28 December 2017 – 21 July 2018)
 Eduardo Villalba caretaker (21 July 2018 – 8 October 2018)
 Leonel Álvarez (9 October 2018 – 6 March 2019)
 José Chamot (7 March 2019 – 15 December 2019)
 Ramón Díaz (17 December 2019 – 24 September 2020)
 Gustavo Morínigo (24 September 2020 – 16 December 2020)
 Juan Samudio caretaker (16 December 2020 – 23 December 2020)
 Daniel Garnero (30 December 2020−)

Basketball
The basketball team of Libertad belongs to the top teams of the national top basketball league and Libertad is after Olimpia the most successful club of Paraguay.

Honours 

 Liga de Baloncesto Metropolitana: 1958, 1972, 1974, 1977, 1979, 1986, 1987, 1990, 2005, 2008, 2009
 Top 5 Profesional: 2008, 2009, 2010
 Liga Nacional de Clubes: 2009
 Súper Copa de Campeones: 2008, 2009
 Liga Femenina de Baloncesto Metropolitana: 1949, 1950, 1951.

References

External links
 Club Libertad Official Site
 Libertad page at Tigo Sports 

 
Libertad
Libertad
Libertad
Association football clubs established in 1905
1905 establishments in Paraguay